The Primetime Emmy Award for Outstanding Technical Direction, Camerawork, Video Control for a Series is awarded to one television series each year. Prior to 1983, regular series competed alongside limited series, movies and specials for Outstanding Achievement in Technical Direction and Electronic Camerawork. Nominations were dominated by specials, leading to the creation of separate awards.

In the following list, the first titles listed in gold are the winners; those not in gold are nominees, which are listed in alphabetical order. The years given are those in which the ceremonies took place.

Winners and nominations

Outstanding Technical Direction and Electronic Camerawork

1970s

1980s

Outstanding Technical Direction, Camerawork, Video Control for a Series

1990s

2000s

2010s

2020s

Programs with multiple awards

13 wins
 Saturday Night Live

5 wins
 Dancing with the Stars

4 wins
 Last Week Tonight with John Oliver

3 wins
 The Golden Girls
 The Tonight Show with Jay Leno

2 wins
 American Idol
 Late Show with David Letterman

Programs with multiple nominations

30 nominations
 Saturday Night Live

14 nominations
 Dancing with the Stars

13 nominations
 Late Show with David Letterman
 The Tonight Show with Jay Leno

10 nominations
 The Voice

9 nominations
 The Big Bang Theory
 Jimmy Kimmel Live!

7 nominations
 American Idol
 The Golden Girls
 Last Week Tonight with John Oliver

6 nominations
 Home Improvement

5 nominations
 The Daily Show with Jon Stewart
 Late Night with Conan O'Brien

4 nominations
 Night Court

3 nominations
 Benson
 Politically Incorrect with Bill Maher
 The Tonight Show Starring Johnny Carson

2 nominations
 The Arsenio Hall Show
 The Charmings
 Empty Nest
 Entertainment Tonight
 Family Ties
 The John Larroquette Show
 The Midnight Special
 The Motown Revue Starring Smokey Robinson
 Muppets Tonight
 30 Rock
 Who's the Boss?
 Win, Lose or Draw

Notes

References

External links
 Academy of Television Arts and Sciences website

Technical Direction, Camerawork, Video Control for a Series